Lyman High School, located in Presho, South Dakota, is the only high school in Lyman County. It is also the only high school in Lyman School District 42–1, which also includes two elementary schools and a middle school. Lyman High School's athletic teams are nicknamed the "Raiders".

Lyman High School includes most of Lyman County including the towns of Vivian, Presho, Kennebec, Reliance, and Lower Brule.

See also

 List of high schools in South Dakota

References

External links
 

Public high schools in South Dakota
Buildings and structures in Lyman County, South Dakota
Education in Lyman County, South Dakota